Meknès Prefecture is a prefecture in the Fès-Meknès region of Morocco. It was created from the former prefectures of Meknès-El Menzeh and Al Ismaïlia. The prefecture is divided administratively into the following:

References